Anabad may refer to:
Anabad, Azerbaijan, a village in Nakhchivan, Azerbaijan
Anabad District, a district of Iran
Anabad, Iran, the capital of Anabad District